Soup Creek is a stream located in Modoc County in the U.S. state of California.

References

Rivers of Modoc County, California
Geography of California